The Former Fanling Magistracy is located at No. 302 Jockey Club Road in Fanling, Hong Kong.

History
The then Fanling Magistracy building was erected in 1960 and began operations in 1961. The building was closed when the magistracy moved to the Fanling Law Courts Building, opened in 2002, and has remained vacant since.

Conservation
The Fanling Magistracy building was included in the Batch II and Batch III (as re-launch) of the Revitalising Historic Buildings Through Partnership Scheme. A project presented by The Hong Kong Federation of Youth Groups was selected for the adaptive reuse of the building.

See also
 Magistrates' Court (Hong Kong)
 Former Central Magistracy
 Old South Kowloon District Court
 Western Magistracy
 San Po Kong Magistracy
 South Kowloon Magistracy 
 North Kowloon Magistracy

References

External links

 Floor plans and pictures

Fanling
Government buildings in Hong Kong
Judiciary of Hong Kong
Grade III historic buildings in Hong Kong